Mount Spetch is a  mountain summit located in the Coast Mountains, in Joffre Lakes Provincial Park, in southwestern British Columbia, Canada. It is part of the Joffre Group, which is a subset of the Lillooet Ranges. The mountain's name was submitted by Karl Ricker of the Alpine Club of Canada to honor Samuel W. Spetch, who operated the general store at Birken, and other businesses in Pemberton. The name was officially adopted on January 23, 1979, by the Geographical Names Board of Canada. The first ascent of the mountain was made in 1971 by J. Oswald and G. Walter. Precipitation runoff from the peak drains into Joffre Creek and Twin One Creek, both tributaries of the Lillooet River. The mountain and its climate supports the Matier Glacier on the northern slope.

Climate
Based on the Köppen climate classification, Mount Spetch is located in a subarctic climate zone of western North America. Most weather fronts originate in the Pacific Ocean, and travel east toward the Coast Mountains where they are forced upward by the range (Orographic lift), causing them to drop their moisture in the form of rain or snowfall. As a result, the Coast Mountains experience high precipitation, especially during the winter months in the form of snowfall. Temperatures can drop below −20 °C with wind chill factors below −30 °C. The months July through September offer the most favorable weather for climbing Mount Spetch.

Climbing Routes
Established climbing routes on Mount Spetch:
   
 East Side -  summer ascent with glacier travel
 Northwest Face - winter ascent via steep snow

References

Gallery

See also

 Geography of British Columbia
 Geology of British Columbia

External links
 Weather: Mountain Forecast
 Sam Spetch photo: Pemberton Museum

Two-thousanders of British Columbia
Lillooet Ranges